WNPE (102.7 FM) is a public radio station, providing programming from The Public's Radio (formerly known as Rhode Island Public Radio) to southern Rhode Island from its transmitter at Narragansett Pier. It was the first FM transmitter in the network. Prior to operating noncommercially, the 102.7 facility was a commercial radio station from its sign-on in 1990 to 2007.

History

As a commercial radio station
On July 15, 1990, WPJB signed on. Reviving a historic call sign that had been abandoned at 105.1 FM in Providence when it became WWLI in 1985, WPJB broadcast an adult contemporary format and was owned and operated by Full Power Radio of Narragansett, Inc.

Full Power Radio of Narragansett sold WPJB to Back Bay Broadcasters for $1.05 million in 1997; the station became a simulcast of Back Bay's rhythmic CHR outlet WWKX "Kix 106" and changed its call letters to WAKX to reflect the new programming. Back Bay became AAA Entertainment in 1999; the two companies were commonly owned.

WWKX-WAKX added Howard Stern to its program lineup in 1998. The stations carried Stern through the end of his terrestrial radio run, though, alongside some other Citadel stations, "Hot 106" began cutting his show short because Stern was excessively promoting his soon-to-be-new home at Sirius Satellite Radio.

Citadel Broadcasting acquired WWKX, WAKX, and a station in Montauk, New York, from AAA Entertainment for $16.5 million in 2003; the sale of WAKX was not finished until 2005. Citadel immediately optioned WAKX, along with WKKB in Middletown, to Davidson Media Group in a $7.5 million sale, breaking the simulcast. By 2007, WAKX was running a smooth jazz format, leased out to Craig Rapoza.

Sale to Rhode Island Public Radio
On March 23, 2007, the former Foundation for Ocean State Public Radio, renamed Rhode Island Public Radio, announced its acquisition of WRNI (1290 AM), a National Public Radio member station run by WBUR-FM in Boston. At the same time, the foundation announced that it was buying WAKX from Davidson for $2.65 million, funded by the Rhode Island Foundation. The acquisition brought NPR service for the first time to southern Rhode Island communities that were outside of WRNI's coverage area, beginning May 17, 2007, when WAKX became WRNI-FM and began carrying WRNI's programming full-time. WAKX's former jazz programming moved to WALE (990 AM).

In 2018, concurrent with RIPR's relaunch as The Public's Radio, the call letters were changed to WNPE.

HD Radio multicast
From March 2013 until February 2018, MVYradio leased the HD2 multicast channel of WNPE to broadcast a modified content stream of WMVY 88.7 FM on Martha's Vineyard; this fed translator W243AI 96.5 FM, which broadcast from the roof of Newport Hospital. This allowed WMVY programming to continue being heard on the translator after the original WMVY was sold to Boston University and became WBUA.

References

External links

NPE
Radio stations established in 1990
1990 establishments in Rhode Island
NPR member stations
Narragansett, Rhode Island
News and talk radio stations in the United States